Pacifico Salandanan (born 22 September 1929) is a Filipino former sports shooter. He competed in the 50 metre rifle, prone event at the 1964 Summer Olympics.

References

External links
 

1929 births
Possibly living people
Filipino male sport shooters
Olympic shooters of the Philippines
Shooters at the 1964 Summer Olympics
Place of birth missing (living people)